Castle Peak Bay is a bay outside Tuen Mun. Tuen Mun River empties into the bay. In the past, many Tanka fishermen harboured at the bay.

In 1513, explorer Jorge Álvares arrived in the Pearl River Delta and started a Portuguese settlement, Tamão. One source specifically states that it was located at the "bay of Tunmen ... now called Castle Peak".

There are several barbecue sites and recreation facilities near the bay including the Castle Peak Beach and other beaches. Castle Peak Bay is served by MTR Bus routes K51, K58, Kowloon Motor Bus 52X and 53.

References

Bays of Hong Kong
Tuen Mun